"Head Down" is a non-fiction essay by Stephen King that first appeared in The New Yorker in 1990 and was later republished as part of his 1993 short story collection, Nightmares & Dreamscapes. It also pairs with another work in that collection, Brooklyn August.

Plot 
The essay chronicles the 1989 season for his son Owen's Little League baseball team, Bangor West. He takes the reader through the ups and downs of the season, giving details of every game, as well as  practice sessions and time on the road while focusing on the reactions of the players and the coaches. This builds to the team winning a hard-fought victory in the final game of the tournament to become the Maine State Champions. The team then goes forward to the Eastern Regional Tournament, only to be beaten in the second round.  However, the story ends on a high note as the team coach, Dave Mansfield, is honored as amateur coach of the year by the United States Baseball Federation. The team also featured eventual Major League pitcher Matt Kinney.

References

External links
King's official website

1990 books
American essays
Works originally published in The New Yorker